The , also referred to as the Real World Championship was a championship established and promoted by New Japan Pro-Wrestling. Karl Gotch was billed as a first champion by New Japan Pro-Wrestling.

Title history

See also
NWF Heavyweight Championship, the championship that succeeded the Real World Championship as the top title in NJPW

Notes

References

New Japan Pro-Wrestling championships
World heavyweight wrestling championships